Dilipa is a genus of butterflies in the family Nymphalidae.

Species
Dilipa fenestra (Leech, 1891)
Dilipa morgiana (Westwood, [1850]) – golden emperor

External links
"Dilipa Moore, 1857" at Markku Savela's Lepidoptera and Some Other Life Forms

Apaturinae
Nymphalidae genera
Taxa named by Frederic Moore